Ratheim is the second largest district of Hückelhoven, Germany.

People 
 Adolf Freiherr Spies von Büllesheim (1929-2011), German politician, farmer and lawyer

References

Populated places in North Rhine-Westphalia